Western Renegades is a 1949 American Western film directed by Wallace Fox and written by Adele Buffington. The film stars Johnny Mack Brown, Max Terhune, Poni Adams, Hugh Prosser, Riley Hill and Marshall Reed. The film was released on October 9, 1949, by Monogram Pictures.

Plot

Cast          
Johnny Mack Brown as Johnny Mack Brown
Max Terhune as Alibi
Poni Adams as Judy Gordon
Hugh Prosser as Jim Laren
Riley Hill as Joe Gordon
Marshall Reed as Frank
Constance Worth as Ann Gordon
Steve Clark as Dusty Dekker
Terry Frost as Carl
William Ruhl as Curly
John Merton as Blacksmith 
Myron Healey as Gus
Milburn Morante as Jenkins
Marshall Bradford as Paul Gordon

References

External links
 

1949 films
American Western (genre) films
1949 Western (genre) films
Monogram Pictures films
Films directed by Wallace Fox
American black-and-white films
1940s English-language films
1940s American films